Hua Mulan is a legendary folk heroine from the Northern and Southern dynasties era (4th to 6th century CE) of Chinese history.

According to legend, Mulan took her aged father's place in the conscription for the army by disguising herself as a man. In the story, after prolonged and distinguished military service against nomadic hordes beyond the northern frontier, Mulan is honored by the emperor but declines a position of high office. She retires to her hometown, where she is reunited with her family and reveals her gender, much to the astonishment of her comrades. Scholars generally consider Mulan to be a fictional character. Hua Mulan is depicted in the Wu Shuang Pu (Table of Peerless Heroes) by Jin Guliang.

First mentions
The first written record of Mulan is the Ballad of Mulan, a folk song believed to have been composed during the Northern Wei dynasty (386–535 CE) and compiled in an anthology of books and songs during the Southern Chen dynasty (557–589 CE). The historical setting of the Ballad of Mulan is usually the Northern Wei's military campaigns against the nomadic Rouran. A later adaptation has Mulan active around the founding of the Tang dynasty ( 620 CE).

The story of Mulan was taken up in a number of later works, including the 16th-century historical fiction , and many screen and stage adaptations. The Hua Mulan crater on Venus is named after her.

Sources

The Ballad of Mulan was first transcribed in the Musical Records of Old and New, a compilation of books and songs by the monk Zhijiang in the Southern Chen dynasty in the 6th century. The earliest extant text of the poem comes from an 11th- or 12th-century anthology known as the Music Bureau Collection, whose author, Guo Maoqian, explicitly mentions the Musical Records of Old and New as his source for the poem. As a ballad, the lines do not necessarily have equal numbers of syllables. The poem consists of 31 couplets and is mostly composed of five-character phrases, with a few extending to seven or nine.

An adaptation by playwright Xu Wei (d. 1593) dramatized the tale as "The Female Mulan"  or, more fully, "The Heroine Mulan Goes to War in Her Father's Place", in two acts. Later, the character of Mulan was incorporated into the Romance of Sui and Tang, a novel written by Chu Renhuo.

Over time, the story of Mulan rose in popularity as a folk tale among the Chinese people.

Name
The heroine of the poem is given different family names in different versions of her story. The Musical Records of Old and New states Mulan's given name is not known and therefore implies Mulan is her surname.  As the Ballad of Mulan is set in the Northern Wei dynasty when northern China was ruled by ethnic Xianbei, a proto-Mongolic people, there is some evidence that Mulan was not ethnic Han Chinese but Xianbei, who had exclusively compound surnames. Mulan may have been the sinified version of the Xianbei word "umran" which means prosperous.

According to later books such as Female Mulan, her family name is Zhu, while the Romance of Sui and Tang says it is Wei. The family name Hua, which was introduced by Xu Wei, has become the most popular in recent years, in part because of its more poetic meaning and association with the given name "Mulan", which literally means "magnolia."

Historicity
Mulan's name is included in Yan Xiyuan's One Hundred Beauties, which is a compilation of various women in Chinese folklore. There is still a debate whether Mulan is a historical person or just a legend, as her name does not appear in Exemplary Women which is a compilation of biographies of women during the  Northern Wei dynasty.

Though The Ballad of Mulan itself does not expressly indicate the historical setting, the story is commonly attributed to the Northern Wei dynasty due to geographic and cultural references in the ballad. The Northern Wei dynasty was founded by the Tuoba clan of ethnic Xianbei who united northern China in the 4th century (Conquest dynasty). The Tuoba Xianbei rulers were themselves nomads from the northern steppes and became sinified as they ruled and settled in northern China. The Tuoba Xianbei took on the Chinese dynasty name "Wei", changed their own surname from "Tuoba" to "Yuan", and moved the capital from Pingcheng, modern-day Datong, Shanxi Province in the northern periphery of Imperial China, to Luoyang, south of the Yellow River, in the Central Plain, the traditional heartland of China. The emperors of the Northern Wei were known both by the sacred Chinese title, "Son of Heaven", and by "Khagan", the title of the leader of nomadic kingdoms. The Ballad of Mulan refers to the sovereign by both titles. The Northern Wei also adopted the governing institutions of Imperial China, and the office of shangshulang the Khagan offered Mulan is a ministerial position within the shangshusheng, the highest organ of executive power under the emperor.  This offering indicates Mulan was trained in the martial arts and literary arts as she was capable of serving as a civilian official charged with issuing and interpreting written government orders.

The Xianbei in China also retained certain nomadic traditions, and Xianbei women were typically skilled horseback riders.  Another popular Northern Wei folk poem called "Li Bo's Younger Sister" praises Yong Rong, Li Bo's younger sister, for her riding and archery skills. The Ballad of Mulan may have reflected the gender roles and status of women in nomadic societies.

The Northern Wei was engaged in protracted military conflict with the nomadic Rouran, who frequently raided the northern Chinese frontier to loot and pillage. Northern Wei emperors considered the Rouran to be uncivilized "barbarians" and called them Ruanruan or wriggling worms. According to the Book of Wei, the dynasty's official history, Emperor Taiwu of Northern Wei launched a military expedition in 429 against the Rouran by advancing on the Black Mountain and then extending northward to the Yanran Mountain.  Both locations are cited in The Ballad. The Black Mountain corresponds to Shahu Mountain, located southeast of modern-day Hohhot in Inner Mongolia. Yan Mountain, the shorthand for Yanran Mountain, is now known as the Khangai Mountains of central Mongolia. The Northern Wei sought to protect the frontier by establishing a string of frontier garrison commands across what is today Inner Mongolia.

Ballad of Mulan

Synopsis

Mulan sighs at her loom. The Khagan is mobilizing the military, and her father is named in each of the conscription notices from the emperor. Her father is old and her younger brother is just a child, so she decides to take her father's place. She buys a fine horse from the eastern market, saddle and stirrup from the western market, bridle and reins from the southern market and a long whip from the northern market.

She bids farewell to her parents in the morning and leaves for the Black Mountain, encamping by the Yellow River in the evening, where she cannot hear the calls of her parents due to the rushing waters; only the sounds of the barbarians' cavalry in the Yan Mountains. She advances ten thousand li to battle as if flying past the mountains. The sound of the sentry gong cuts through the cold night air, and the moonlight reflects off her metal armor. A hundred battles take place, and generals die.

After the ten-year campaign, the stout veterans return to meet the Son of Heaven (the emperor/Khagan), enthroned in the splendid palace, who confers promotions in rank and prizes of hundreds of thousands. He asks Mulan what she would like. Mulan turns down the high-ranking position of shangshulang in the central government, and asks only for a speedy steed to take her home.

Her parents, upon hearing her return, welcome her outside their hometown. Her elder sister puts on her fine dress. Her younger brother sharpens the knife for the swine and sheep. Mulan returns to her room, changes from her tabard into her old clothes. She combs her hair by the window and, before the mirror, fastens golden yellow flowers. Her comrades are shocked to see her. For 12 years of their enlistment together, they did not realize that she was a woman.

In response, Mulan offers a metaphor: "The male hare has heavy front paws. The female hare tends to squint.  But when they are running side-by-side close to the ground, who can tell me which is male or female?"

Modern adaptations

The story of Hua Mulan has inspired a number of screen and stage adaptations, including:

Stage
Mulan Joins the Army (1917 play) starring Mei Lanfang
Mulan Jr., a one-act stage musical based on the 1998 Disney animated film Mulan
The Legend of Marissa Inouye (2013 dance production) by the Hong Kong Dance Company

Films
Hua Mulan Joins the Army (1927 film) – a silent film released by Tianyi Film Company and directed by Li Pingqian.
Mulan Joins the Army (1928 film) – Mingxing Film Company production, directed by Hou Yao. The film was unsuccessful, in part due to the Tianyi film that was released the previous year.
Mulan Joins the Army (1939 film) (original English title Hua Mu Lan),  – Chinese film made during the Second Sino-Japanese War, directed by Bu Wancang and written by Ouyang Yuqian. The film also created a large spark of popularity, in terms of literature.
Lady General Hua Mu-lan (1964 film) – Hong Kong opera film.
Saga of Mulan (1994 film) – Film adaptation of the Chinese opera based on the legend.
Mulan (1998 film) – Disney animated feature, and the basis of many derivative works. Disney's version of the Mulan character (named Fa Mulan) has subsequently appeared in other media and promotions, mainly as part of the Disney Princess product line.
Mulan II (2004 film) – A direct-to-video Disney animated sequel, set a couple of months after the events of Disney's 1998 film.
Mulan (2020 film) – Live action film from Disney that is a remake of the 1998 animated film.
Mulan, Rise of a Warrior (2009 film) – Chinese live action film.
 Matchless Mulan (2020 film) – Chinese live action film.
 Mulan zhi Jinguo yinghao (2020 film) – Chinese live action film.
 Hua Mulan (2020 film) – Chinese live action film starring Liu Chuxian as the leading actress.
 Kung Fu Mulan (2020 film) – Chinese CGI animation film.
 Mulan Legend (2020 film) – Chinese live action film.

Television series
A Tough Side of a Lady (1998 series) – Hong Kong TVB drama series of Mulan starring Mariane Chan as Hua Mulan.
Hua Mu Lan (1999 series) – Taiwan CTV period drama serial starring Anita Yuen as Hua Mulan.
 Jamie Chung portrays Mulan in the second, third and fifth seasons of the U.S. TV series Once Upon a Time (2012–2013).
Mu Lan (2012) – China production with Elanne Kong starring as Mu Lan
The Legend of Hua Mulan (2013) – CCTV production starring Hou Meng Yao, Dylan Kuo, Liu De Kai, Ray Lui, Dai Chunrong and Angel Wang. It consists of forty-nine episodes.
Star of Tomorrow (2015) - a Hunan TV children's program which features all-child casts performing classic Chinese tales, produced a two-part adaptation of Hua Mulan in 2017, based largely on the Disney film and featuring Chinese versions of well-known songs from Mulan and other Disney films.
Mulan is portrayed in the Roosterteeth web series RWBY as a young male named Lai Ren. All of the members of his team are based on legendary figures who dressed as the opposite sex in their stories

Literature
Maxine Hong Kingston re-visited Mulan's tale in her 1975 text The Woman Warrior. Kingston's version popularized the story in the West and may have led to the Disney animated feature adaptation.
The Legend of Mu Lan: A Heroine of Ancient China was the first English language picture book featuring the character Mulan published in the United States in 1992 by Victory Press.
In the fantasy/alternate history novel Throne of Jade (2006), China's aerial corps is described as being composed of all female captains and their dragons due to the precedent set by the legendary woman warrior.
Cameron Dokey created 'Wild Orchid' in 2009, a retelling of the Ballad of Mulan as part of the Once Upon A Time series of novels published by Simon Pulse, an imprint of Simon & Schuster.
In the comics, Deadpool Killustrated (2013), Hua Mulan, along with Natty Bumppo and Beowulf, is brought together by Sherlock Holmes and Dr. Watson (using H.G. Wells's time machine) to stop Deadpool from killing all beloved literary characters and destroying the literary universe.
Reflection by Elizabeth Lim was published in 2018 as an installment in Disney Press' Twisted Tales series. This is an alternate ending to the Disney film in which Mulan must travel to Diyu, the Underworld, in order to save her captain.
In The Magnolia Sword: A Ballad of Mulan by Sherry Thomas (2019), Mulan has trained in the martial arts since childhood in preparation for a hereditary duel. When she goes to war in her father's stead, she is shocked to discover her team's captain is also her opponent in the duel.
Mulan: Before the Sword, written by Grace Lin (2020) and published by Disney Press, is written as a prequel to the Disney live action movie released in the same year.

Children's books
Wuloom Family (episode 5) - in Chinese
The Ballad of Mulan by Song Nan Zhang (1998) – in English
I am Hua Mulan, by Qin Wenjun, illust. Yu Rong (2017) – in Chinese
Mulan: The Legend of the Woman Warrior, by Faye-Lynn Wu, illustrated by Joy Ang (2019)

Video games
 Kingdom Hearts II - Mulan is an optional party member in the Land of Dragons. Note that this is the Disney version of the character.
 Smite – Mulan is a playable character
 Romance of the Three Kingdoms XIV – Mulan is an unlockable Legendary officer that can be added at the beginning of new scenarios in the game.
 Civilization VI - Mulan is a summonable hero in the Heroes and Legends game mode
 Goddess of Genesis - Mulan is a summonable hero through the game's gacha mechanism
 Mulan - Mulan video game from 1998, playable on a Game Boy.
 Mulan is a playable character in the Mobile/PC Game Rise of Kingdoms.

See also
 Han E
 List of women warriors in folklore
 Valentina Ramírez Avitia
 Women warriors
 Joan of Arc

Notes

Reference notes

References

Further reading
Dong, Lan. Mulan's Legend and Legacy in China and the United States (Temple University Press, 2010) 263 pages; Traces literary and other images of Mulan from premodern China to contemporary China and the United States.
 Kwa, Shiamin and Wilt L. Idema. Mulan: Five Versions of a Chinese Legend (Hackett, 2011).
 Rea, Christopher. Chinese Film Classics, 1922-1949 (Columbia University Press, 2021), chapter 9: Hua Mu Lan (Mulan congjun ).
Ballad of Mulan from Columbia University

External links

Information on the historical Mulan
The Legend of Mulan: A Heroine of Ancient China, a bilingual Chinese/English children's picture book
Ode to Mulan The original poem in Chinese and English side-by-side translation.
'The Ballad of Mulan': A Rhyming Translation, Translation by Evan Mantyk
 Hua Mu Lan (1939 film, directed by Richard Poh [Bu Wancang]), with English subtitles
The female individual and the empire: A historicist approach to Mulan and Kingston's woman warrior
The poem in Chinese calligraphy (images), simplified characters, traditional characters, and an English translation
The poem in printed Chinese, with hyperlinks to definitions and etymologies

 
Legendary Chinese people
Chinese poems
Chinese warriors
Fictional cross-dressers
Fictional Chinese people in literature
Women warriors
Fictional female generals
Fictional Northern Wei people
Women in ancient Chinese warfare
People whose existence is disputed
Heroes in mythology and legend